This is a list of the 166 civil parishes in the ceremonial county of Northumberland, England. The whole of the county is parished.

List of parishes 
Acklington
Acomb
Adderstone with Lucker
Akeld
Allendale
Alnham
Alnmouth
Alnwick (town)
Alwinton
Amble by the Sea (town)
Ancroft
Ashington (town)
Bamburgh
Bardon Mill
Bavington
Beadnell
Belford
Bellingham
Belsay
Berwick-upon-Tweed (town)
Bewick
Biddlestone
Birtley
Blanchland
Blyth
Bowsden
Branxton
Brinkburn
Broomhaugh and Riding
Bywell
Callaly
Capheaton
Carham
Chatton
Chillingham
Chollerton
Choppington
Coanwood
Corbridge
Cornhill-on-Tweed
Corsenside
Cramlington (town)
Craster
Cresswell
Denwick
Doddington
Duddo
Earle
East Bedlington
East Chevington
Edlingham
Eglingham
Ellingham
Ellington and Linton
Elsdon
Embleton
Ewart
Falstone
Featherstone
Felton
Ford
Glanton
Greenhead
Greystead
Haltwhistle (town)
Harbottle
Hartburn
Hartleyburn
Hauxley
Haydon
Healey
Hebron
Heddon-on-the-Wall
Hedgeley
Hedley
Henshaw
Hepple
Hepscott
Hesleyhurst
Hexham (town)
Hexhamshire
Hollinghill
Holy Island
Horncliffe
Horsley
Humshaugh
Ilderton
Ingram
Kielder
Kilham
Kirknewton
Kirkwhelpington
Knaresdale with Kirkhaugh
Kyloe
Lesbury
Lilburn
Longframlington
Longhirst
Longhorsley
Longhoughton
Lowick
Lynemouth
Matfen
Meldon
Melkridge
Middleton
Milfield
Mitford
Morpeth (town)
Netherton
Netherwitton
Newbiggin by the Sea
Newbrough
Newton-by-the-Sea
Newton-on-the-Moor and Swarland
Norham
North Sunderland
Nunnykirk
Ord
Otterburn
Ovingham
Ovington
Pegswood
Plenmeller with Whitfield
Ponteland (town)
Prudhoe (town)
Rennington
Rochester
Roddam
Rothbury
Rothley
Sandhoe
Seaton Valley (community)
Shilbottle
Shoreswood
Shotley Low Quarter
Simonburn
Slaley
Snitter
Stamfordham
Stannington
Stocksfield
Tarset
Thirlwall
Thirston
Thropton
Togston
Tritlington and West Chevington
Ulgham
Wall
Wallington Demesne
Warden
Wark
Warkworth
West Allen
West Bedlington (town)
Whalton
Whittingham
Whittington
Whitton and Tosson
Widdrington Station and Stobswood
Widdrington Village
Wooler
Wylam

Notes

See also
 List of civil parishes in England

References

External links
 Office for National Statistics : Geographical Area Listings
 Northumberland County Council : Parish and Town Councils

Civil parishes
Northumberland